Swami Vivekanand Institute of Engineering & Technology  (SVIET) was established by the Sh.Ragnunath Rai Memorial Educational & Charitable Trust.

Alumni
 Jawaad Khan
  Amrit Maan
 Satbir Aujla

External links 
 sviet.ac.in, Official Website

Universities and colleges in Punjab, India
Educational institutions established in 2004
2004 establishments in Punjab, India
Patiala district